Marcheline is a female given name. It is a feminine form of Marcellin, a derivative of the Latin Marcellinus.

Marcheline can refer to:

 Marcheline Bertrand, actress and mother of Angelina Jolie
 Brangelina (Vivienne Marcheline Jolie-Pitt)
 Susane Marcheline Rachelle "Creepy Susie" Garnier, a character from the TV series The Oblongs - see Creepy Susie and 13 Other Tragic Tales for Troubled Children

See also 

 Marceline